The Kingdom of Ramnad or Ramnad estate was a permanently settled kingdom and later zamindari estate that existed in the Ramnad subdivision of the Madurai district and later Ramnad district of the erstwhile Madras Presidency in British India from 1601. It was ruled by the rajas also had the title of Sethupathi. Madurai Nayaks ruled the Ramnad area with the appointed chieftains between 14th to 16th century CE, and in 17th century CE the appointed governors expanded their power to establish "Ramnad Kingdom" which was also called as "Maravar Kingdom" by the British. In 1795 CE, after an heir dispute, they were reduced to the status of zamidari by the East India Company. After the independence of India in 1947 the estates were merged in the Union of India and in 1949 all rulers lost the ruling rights, privy purse was also finally abolished in 1971.

The seat of administration was the town of Ramanathapuram. The Zamindari had its origins in the administrative area of Ramnad established by Muthu Krishnappa Nayak in the 1605 AD. After the fall of Madurai Nayaks, the governors established Kingdom of Ramnad. In 1803, the kingdom was converted to a zamindari by the British. The male rulers of Ramnathapuram also bore the title of Sethupathi or "protector of the bridge", the bridge here referring to the legendary Rama's Bridge while female rulers bore the title "Nachiyar".

Legend 

The estate of Ramnad included the Hindu holy island city of Rameswaram, from where, legend has it that the Hindu god Rama launched his invasion of Ravana's Lanka. On the conclusion of the war and Rama's success in it, he appointed a Sethupathi or "lord of the bridge" to guard the way to the island. The "bridge" referred to here is the legendary Rama's Bridge which was believed to have been constructed by Rama. The chieftains of Ramnad were entrusted with the responsibility of protecting the bridge, hence the appellation.

History

14th-16th century CE: As traditional Maravar kings 

During  Muttu Krishnappa Nayak (1601–1609 A.D.) of Madurai Nayak dynasty reign, the Ramnadu region, due to lack of efficient leadership, crimes and robbery were found frequently against pilgrims of Rameswaram  through  the  wild jungle. Due to lack of knowledge of the Jungles, Nayak army found it hard to control the robbers. Therefore, Muthu Krishnappa Nayaka (1601-1609  A.D.) laid down the foundation of the rule of the Sethupathi (watchmen of the bridge ) of Ramnad area under the Madurai Nayaks and made an agreement with the locals to stop the robbery. Muthu Krishnappa Nayaka appointed Sadayakka Teva as Sethupathi in 1605 A.D. to stop crimes and protect the pilgrims of Rameswaram through the  wild and inhospitable region. When the power of the Nayak kings of Madurai began to decline in the late 17th century, the Raghunatha Kilavan of Ramnad asserted his independence.

17th-19th century CE: Rise as Ramnad Kingdom or Maravar Kingdom 

In the late 17th century, Raghunatha Kilavan crowned himself king of Ramnad and changed his seat from Pogalur to Ramnad close to the east coast on the request of Muslim trade merchants to give protection against Portuguese traders. With the help and fund from Muslim trade merchants, he erected massive fortifications to protect his capital. He ruled from 1673 to 1708 and oversaw the growth of the feudal chieftainship of Ramnad into powerful "Kingdom of Ramnad" which is known as "Maravar Kingdom". In 1725, the king of Tanjore claimed the northern part of the Ramnad kingdom (the Aranthangi region) up to the river Pambar in return for his services during the civil war in Ramnad. A vassal of Ramnad who was amongst the victors in the civil war took over the westerly located Sivaganga region, thereby leaving only three-fifths of the kingdom actually in the hands of the king of Ramnad.

19th-20th century CE: reduced to zamidari jagir during British Raj 

Ramnad participated in the Carnatic wars between the British and the French East India companies. The state came under British influence in the 1790s and the king of Ramnad was deposed in 1795 for misrule. The British, then, made the king's sister the ruler of Ramnad and deprecated the kingdom to a zamindari by a permanent sanad granting them jagir of Ramnad in 1803. Since then, until the India's independence in 1947, Ramnad was ruled by the queen and her descendants.

Raja Bhaskara Sethupathi, who lived in the late 19th century, borrowed large amounts of money from Nagarathar creditors for construction of irrigation works and massive developments projects and for charitable purposes that he soon ran into heavy debt. In 1895, most of the estate was pledged to the creditors who set up a trust for its administration and maintenance. Bhaskara Sethupathi's successors actively supported the Justice Party. Shanmugha Rajeswara Sethupathi was an active supporter of the Justice Party and promoted the Self-Respect Movement.

After the independence of India in 1947, the Government of India marged estates, jagiirs, kingdom with the Union of India. Consequently, in 1949 all rulers lost the ruling rights. In 1971, privy purse, an allowance given to the former rulers, was also abolished, thus ending all entitlements.

List of Sethupathi rulers

Chieftains With the Madurai Nayaks 
 Udaiyan Sethupathi (a) Sadaikkan (1601–1623)
 Koottan Sethupathi (1623–1635)
 Dalavai Raghunatha Sethupathi (1635–1645)
 Thirumalai Raghunatha Sethupathi (1646–1676)
 Raja Suriya Sethupathi (1676)
 Aathana Raghunatha Sethupathi (1677)

Independent kings of Ramnad Kingdom 
 Raghunatha Kilavan Sethupathi (1678–1710)
 Muthu Vairavanatha Sethupathi I (1710–1712)
  Vijaya Raghunatha Sethupathi (1713-1725)
 Sundaresvara Raghunatha Sethupathi (1725)
 Bavani Sangara Sethupathi (1725–1727)
 Kumara Muthu Vijaya Raghunatha Sethupathi (1728–1735)
 Sivakumara Muthu Vijaya Raghunatha Sethupathi (1735-1747)
 Rakka Thevar Sethupathi (1748)
 Sella Muthu Vijaya Raghunatha Sethupathi (1749–1762)
 Muthuramalinga Vijaya Ragunatha Sethupathi I (1762-1772 1781-1795)

Ruler of princely state under British Raj 
 As king 
 Mangaleswari Nachiyar (1795–1803)

 As Zamindars
 Mangaleswari Nachiyar (1803–1807)
 Annaswami Sethupathi (1807–1820)
 Ramaswami Sethupathi (1820–1830)
 Muthu Chella Thevar Sethupathi (1830–1846)
 Parvatha Vardhani Ammal Nachchiyar (1846–1862)
 Muthuramalinga Sethupathi II (1862–1873)
 Court of Wards (1873–1889)
 Bhaskara Sethupathy (1889–1903)
 Dinakara Sethupathy 
 Raja Rajeswara Sethupathi (1903–1929)
 Shanmugha Rajeswara Sethupathi (1929–1949)
 Bharath Vaj   (1999 to be continue)

Ramnad estate during British raj

Location 

The estate of Ramnad was located between 9 degrees 6' and 10 degrees 6' N latitude and 77 degrees 56' and 79 degrees 19' E longitudes. It comprised the southern and eastern portion of Madura district and included the whole Bay of Bengal coast of the district.

Area and population 

It was one of the largest and most populous zamindari estates in the Madras Presidency. The zamindar of Ramnad paid a tribute of  3.75 lakh for the year 1903-04 to the British government.

Subdivisions 
Then part of the Madurai district, the estate was subdivided into five zamindari tehsils: Ramnad, Tiruvadanai, Paramakudi, Tiruchuli and Mudukulathur. The administration was based in the town of Ramanathapuram in Ramnad tehsil. Ramanathapuram, Kilakkarai, Paramakudi, Rameswaram, Mandapam and Pamban were some of the important towns in the estate.

See also
 Sethupathi, title of Raghunatha Kilavan and his descendants
 Maravar, community to which Ramnad / Sethypathu kings belonged
 Thanjavur Nayak kingdom, once ally and later adversary of Sethupathis
 Madurai Nayak dynasty, once ally and later adversary of Sethupathis
 Marava War of Succession, war of succession after  Vijaya Raghunatha Sethupathi

References

Bibliography 

 

States and territories established in 1601
States and territories disestablished in 1949
Zamindari estates
Madras Presidency
Madurai district